Bye Bye Baby may refer to:

Songs

 "Bye Bye Baby", a song from the 1949 Broadway musical Gentlemen Prefer Blondes and sung by Marilyn Monroe in the 1953 film
 "Bye Bye Baby", a song written by American Frank McNulty and sung by Australian Col Joye in 1959
 "Bye Bye Baby" (Mary Wells song), 1960 debut single by Motown singer Mary Wells
Bye Bye Baby I Don't Want to Take a Chance, her 1961 album
 "Bye, Bye, Baby (Baby Goodbye)", a 1965 song performed by The Four Seasons and later covered by the Bay City Rollers
"Bye, Bye Baby", from the eponymous 1966 Big Brother and the Holding Company (album), featuring Janis Joplin
 "Bye Bye Baby", a song from the 1978 Pain Killer
 "Bye Bye Baby", a song written by Joey Ramone for the 1987 Ramones album Halfway to Sanity and later covered by Ronnie Spector
 "Bye Bye Baby", a song by Social Distortion from their 1992 album Somewhere Between Heaven and Hell
 "Bye Bye Baby" (Madonna song), a song from 1992 album Erotica
 "Bye Bye Baby" (CatCat song), 1994 Finnish Eurovision Song Contest entry
 "Bye Bye Baby", a song by G. Love & Special Sauce from the 1995 album Coast to Coast Motel
 "Bye Bye Baby", a song by TQ from the 1998 album They Never Saw Me Coming
 "Bye Bye Baby", a song by OK Go from the 2002 OK Go
 "Bye Bye Baby", a song by Saves the Day from the 2007 album Under the Boards
 "Bye Bye Baby", a song by Noname from the 2016 mixtape Telefone
 "Bye Bye Baby", a song by Kanye West originally meant to appear on Yandhi, the album that became Jesus Is King (2019)
 "Bye Bye Baby", a song by Dagny from the 2020 album Strangers / Lovers
 "Bye Bye Baby", a song by Taylor Swift from the 2021 album Fearless (Taylor's Version)

Other uses
 Bye Bye Baby (film), a 1989 film starring Brigitte Nielsen and Carol Alt
 "Bye-Bye, Baby!", signature home run call of Russ Hodges of the San Francisco Giants baseball team

See also 
Buy Buy Baby, American chain of stores for young children, established in 1996
"Buy, Buy Baby", episode of the American television series Will & Grace in 2006
"Goodbye Priscilla (Bye Bye Baby Blue)", 1977 single by Gene Summers
"Baby Baby Bye Bye", 1960 song by Jerry Lee Lewis 
 "Baby Bye Bye", 1984 song by Gary Morris